Adelptes vadoni is a species of beetle in the genus Adelptes. It is known from Madagascar.

References

Mordellinae